Peggy Yovana O'Brien (born c. 1988 in Santa Cruz de la Sierra) is Miss Bolivia Earth 2010 and Miss Bicentenario.

References

1988 births
Miss Earth 2010 contestants
Living people
Bolivian beauty pageant winners
Bolivian people of Irish descent
People from Santa Cruz de la Sierra